Marian feast days in the liturgical year are celebrated in honour of the Blessed Virgin Mary. The number of Marian feasts celebrated, their names (and at times dates) can vary among Christian denominations.

History and development

Early history
The earliest feasts that relate to Mary grew out of the cycle of feasts that celebrate the Nativity of Jesus Christ. Given that according to the Gospel of Luke, forty days after the birth of Jesus, along with the Presentation of Jesus at the Temple, Mary was purified according to Jewish customs, the Feast of the Purification began to be celebrated by the 5th century, and became the Feast of Simeon in Byzantium.

The origin of Marian feasts is lost to history.  Although there are references to specific Marian feasts introduced into the liturgies in later centuries, there are indications that Christians celebrated Mary very early on.  Methodius, a bishop (died 311) from the 3rd and early 4th century, wrote:
And what shall I conceive, what shall I speak worthy of this day? I am struggling to reach the inaccessible, for the remembrance of this holy virgin far transcends all words of mine. Wherefore, since the greatness of the panegyric required completely puts to shame our limited powers, let us betake ourselves to that hymn which is not beyond our faculties, and boasting in our own unalterable defeat, let us join the rejoicing chorus of Christ’s flock, who are keeping holy-day ... We keep festival, not according to the vain customs of the Greek mythology; we keep a feast which brings with it no ridiculous or frenzied banqueting of the gods, but which teaches us the wondrous condescension to us men of the awful glory of Him who is God over all ... Do thou, therefore, O lover of this festival ...

A separate feast for Mary, connected with the Christmastide, originated in the 5th century, even perhaps before the First Council of Ephesus of 431. It seems certain that the sermon by Proclus before Nestorius (the Archbishop of Constantinople whose Nestorianism rejected the title of Theotokos) which began the controversy that led to the council was about a feast for the Virgin Mary.

In the 8th and 9th centuries four more Marian feasts were established in the Eastern Church. Byzantine Emperor Maurice selected August 15 as the date of the feast of Dormition and Assumption. The feast of the Nativity of Mary was perhaps started in the first half of the 7th century in the Eastern Church. In the Western Church a feast dedicated to Mary, just before Christmas was celebrated in the Churches of Milan and Ravenna in Italy in the 7th century. The four Roman Marian feasts of Purification, Annunciation, Assumption and Nativity of Mary were gradually and sporadically introduced into England and by the 11th century were being celebrated there.

Development of feasts
Over time, the number and nature of feasts (and the associated Titles of Mary) and the venerative practices that accompany them have varied a great deal among diverse Christian traditions. Overall, there are significantly more titles, feasts and venerative Marian practices among Roman Catholics than any other Christians traditions.

Some differences in feasts originate from doctrinal issues – the Feast of the Assumption is such an example. Given that there is no agreement among all Christians on the circumstances of the death, Dormition or Assumption of Mary, the feast of assumption is celebrated among some denominations and not others. In his early years, Martin Luther used to celebrate the Feast of the Assumption, but towards the end of his life he stopped celebrating it.

While the Western Catholics celebrate the Feast of the Assumption on 15 August, some Eastern Catholics celebrate it as Dormition of the Mother of God, and may do so on 28 August, if they follow the Julian calendar. The Eastern Orthodox also celebrate it as the Dormition of the Mother of God, one of their 12 Great Feasts. The Armenian Apostolic Church celebrates the Feast of Dormition not on a fixed date, but on the Sunday nearest 15 August. Moreover, the practices apart from doctrinal differences also vary, e.g. for the Eastern Orthodox the feast is preceded by the 14-day Dormition Fast.

Feasts continue to be developed, e.g. the feast of the Queenship of Mary was declared in the 1954 in the papal encyclical Ad Caeli Reginam by pope Pius XII. The initial ceremony for this feast involved the crowning of the Salus Populi Romani icon of the Virgin Mary in Rome by Pius XII as part of a procession in Rome, and is unique to Roman Catholics.

Other differences in feasts relate to specific events that occurred in history. For instance, the Feast of Our Lady of Victory (later renamed Feast of Our Lady of the Rosary) was based on the 1571 victory of the Papal States against the Ottoman Empire in the Battle of Lepanto, is hence unique to Roman Catholics.

In the Catholic Church 

The most prominent Marian feast days in the General Roman Calendar are:
 January 1: Solemnity of Mary, Mother of God
 May 31 (in some locations July 2): The Visitation of the Blessed Virgin Mary
 Monday after Pentecost: The Blessed Virgin Mary, Mother of the Church
 1 day after the Solemnity of the Most Sacred Heart of Jesus: The Immaculate Heart of the Blessed Virgin Mary
 August 5: Saint Mary Major (Santa Maria Maggiore; also known as Saint Mary of the Snows)
 August 15: The Assumption of the Blessed Virgin Mary (Solemnity) 
 August 22: The Queenship of Mary
 September 8: The Nativity of the Blessed Virgin Mary also known as Marymas
 September 12: Most Holy Name of the Blessed Virgin Mary
 September 15: Our Lady of Sorrows
 October 7: Our Lady of the Rosary
 November 21: The Presentation of Mary
 December 8: Solemnity of the The Immaculate Conception of the Blessed Virgin Mary
Note: Solemnities and feasts are in bold face. Memorials are in regular face.

Optional Marian memorials in the General Roman Calendar are:
 February 11: Our Lady of Lourdes
 May 13: Our Lady of Fatima
 July 16: Our Lady of Mount Carmel
 December 10: Our Lady of Loreto
 December 12: Our Lady of Guadalupe

There are many more Marian commemorations celebrated in various localities, but not included in the General Roman Calendar.

During the month of May, May devotions to the Blessed Virgin Mary take place in many Catholic regions. There is no firm structure as to the content of a May devotion. It includes usually the singing of Marian anthems, readings from the Scriptures, a sermon or a presentation by local choirs. The whole rosary is prayed separately and is usually not a part of a Marian devotion, although Hail Marys are included. The devotion was promoted by the Jesuits and spread to Jesuit colleges and to the entire Latin Church and since that time it has been a regular feature of Catholic life. Marian devotions may be held within the family, around a "May Altar" consisting of a table with a Marian picture decorated with many May flowers. The family would then pray together the  rosary. May devotions exist in the entire Latin church and since that time have been a regular feature of Catholic life.

Traditionally, the month of October is "rosary month" in the Catholic Church, when the faithful are encouraged to pray the rosary if possible. Since 1571, Mary, Queen of the Holy Rosary, is venerated on October 7. In 2005 Pope Benedict XVI stated:

In the Eastern Orthodox Church 
Among the most prominent Marian feast days in the Eastern Orthodox and Greek-Catholic liturgical calendars are:

 February 2 Purification of the Most Holy Theotokos
 March 25 Annunciation of the Theotokos
 March 30 The Visitation of the Blessed Virgin Mary
 Fifth Saturday in Lent Saturday of the Akathist Hymn
 Bright Friday Feast of the Mother of God, the Life-Giving Spring
 July 2 The Placing of the Honorable Robe of the Most Holy Mother of God at Blachernae
 July 25 Dormition of the Righteous Anna, the Mother of the Most Holy Theotokos
 1 August Feast to the All-Merciful Saviour and the Most Holy Mother of God.
 August 15 Dormition of the Mother of God
 August 31 The Placing of the Cincture (Sash) of the Mother of God
 September 8 Nativity of the Theotokos
 September 9 Afterfeast of the Nativity of the Mother of God, Holy and Righteous Ancestors of God, Joachim and Anna
 October 1 Protection of Our Most Holy Lady Theotokos and Ever-Virgin Mary
 November 21 The Entry of the Most Holy Theotokos into the Temple
 December 9 Feast of the Conception of the Most Holy Theotokos
 December 26 Synaxis of the Theotokos

Note: Feasts ranked among the twelve Great Feasts are in bold face. Minor feasts are in regular face.

Feast days are also established for famous icon of Mary.

Purification of the Most Holy Theotokos is also considered as Feasts of Jesus Christ.

Protection of Our Most Holy Lady Theotokos and Ever-Virgin Mary in Russian Church is treated as twelve Great Feasts.

In 10th century Visitation of Mary was commemorated on 1 April.

In the Oriental Orthodox Church 
In the Coptic Orthodox rite St. Mary is commemorated on the 21st of each Coptic month (Generally the 30th/31st of each Gregorian month).
 January 22 Wedding at Cana
 January 29 Dormition of Saint Mary, the Theotokos
 April 2 Apparition of Saint Mary in the Church of Zeitoun
 April 7 Annunciation of the Birth of Christ
 May 9 Birth of Saint Mary
 June 1 Entry of the Lord Christ into Egypt
 June 28 Commemoration of the First Church for the Virgin Mary in the City of Philippi
 August 13 Annunciation of the Birth of Saint Mary
 August 22 Assumption of the Body of Saint Mary
 December 13 Entrance of Saint Mary into the Temple at Jerusalem

In the Syriac Orthodox rite St. Mary is commemorated on the following 8 Major feast days:
 January 15 Virgin Mary of the Sowing
 March 25 Annunciation of the Virgin Mary
 May 15 Feast of the Virgin Mary of the Harvest
 August 15 Dormition and Assumption of the Virgin Mary
 September 8 Nativity of the Virgin Mary
 December 26 Glorification of the Mother of God

In the Malankara Orthodox church St. Mary is commemorated on the following feast days:
 January 1 Virgin Mary, Mother of God
 January 15 Virgin Mary of the Sowing
 March 25 Annunciation of the Virgin Mary
 May 15 Feast of the Virgin Mary of the Harvest
 August 15 Assumption of the Virgin Mary (preceded by 15 days of lent)
 September 8 Nativity of the Virgin Mary(preceded by 8 days of lent)
 December 26 Glorification of the Mother of God

In the Anglican Communion 
In calendars throughout the Anglican Communion and Continuing Anglican churches, the following Marian feasts may be observed, although the practice of different provinces varies widely:

 February 2 Purification of the Blessed Virgin
 February 11 Our Lady of Lourdes
 March 25 Annunciation of Our Saviour to the Blessed Virgin Mary (Lady Day)
 May 1 Queen of Heaven
 May 31 Visitation of the Blessed Virgin Mary
 August 15 The Blessed Virgin Mary or "The Falling Asleep of the Blessed Virgin Mary"
 September 8 Nativity of the Blessed Virgin Mary
 October 15 Our Lady of Walsingham (Catholics feast on September 24, as of 2001)
 December 8 Conception of the Blessed Virgin Mary

In Lutheranism 
Lutherans tend to de-emphasize the importance of Mary out of respect for the centrality of Jesus, yet many or all of the traditional medieval Marian days are retained. Due to disagreements about the perpetual virginity of Mary, many Lutherans avoid using the traditional title of "Blessed Virgin Mary" to preface the feasts or don't celebrate them, although many still retain the title and continue the observances (the Book of Concord also explicitly reaffirms the perpetual virginity of Mary in the Latin form of Martin Luther's Smalcald Articles, and suggests it strongly elsewhere in the German form). 
The following are Marian festivals celebrated within the Lutheran liturgical calendar:

 February 2 Presentation of the Lord, usually referred to as "The Purification of the Blessed Virgin Mary and the Presentation of Our Lord" together (sometimes the order of terms is switched for emphasis), also known as Candlemas
 March 25 Annunciation of Our Lord
 May 31 The Visitation of the Virgin Mary to Elizabeth
 August 15 Mary, Mother of Our Lord (most refer to it simply as St. Mary's Day instead of the Assumption, and some prefer to call it the Dormition)
 September 8: The Nativity of the Blessed Virgin Mary also known as Marymas (few observe this)
 November 21: The Presentation of the Blessed Virgin Mary (few observe this)
 December 8: The Immaculate Conception of the Blessed Virgin Mary (Conception of Mary) (although they almost never use the term "immaculate" and very few observe this due to its Roman Catholic association)

When Johann Sebastian Bach worked as Thomaskantor in Leipzig, three Marian feasts were observed for which he composed church cantatas:
 February 2 Purification
 March 25 Annunciation
 July 2 Visitation

See also
 The Glories of Mary

References

External links
 Comprehensive List of Marian Feasts